Handyside is a surname. Notable people with the surname include:

Andrew Dods Handyside (1835-1904), South Australian politician
George Handyside (1821–1904), English businessman
Peter Handyside (born 1974), Scottish footballer
William Handyside (1793–1850), Scottish engineer

See also
 Andrew Handyside and Company
Handyside Bridge, former railway bridge in Derbyshire, United Kingdom
Handyside v United Kingdom, European Court of Human Rights case
Hundred of Handyside, a cadastral unit in South Australia.